Chevrolet Performance is an automotive performance parts brand that sells everything from camshafts and cylinder heads to high-performance crate engines and upgrades for late-model vehicles. It was founded in 1967 to support the Trans-Am Camaro race teams. Chevrolet Performance was formed as a way to support all the various Trans Am teams across the United States, but the brand saw enough of a demand to start selling the high-performance parts to the general public. Today, Chevrolet Performance not only sells performance parts, but also helps develop Chevrolet’s high-performance vehicles and supports teams in nearly every form of automotive racing.

History 

In 1967, General Motors had a meeting to discuss the factory support needed for the various Trans Am racing teams that GM supported, including Penske Racing. Initially not meant to be sold to the public, Chevrolet saw the opportunity to sell them to a growing number of automotive enthusiasts who wanted them for their vehicles. And from that meeting GM Performance Parts was born.

The next two years played an integral role in the development of the company, with the release of the iconic third-generation Corvette in 1968 and the COPO Camaro in 1969. These models brought the 427 engine to market, which allowed Chevrolet to package them as crate engines, a concept the company conceived itself. The brand could then sell them individually for installation in any GM vehicle-based project.

The year 1970 saw GM’s return to NASCAR®, which put GM Performance Parts in the national spotlight. The company backed every Chevrolet-powered NASCAR team in the field and shipped the parts to the teams’ local Chevrolet dealerships to alleviate the storage and distribution issues. The company’s biggest boost came from its association with Junior Johnson, whose team won three straight titles in 1976, ’77, and ’78. That is until Dale Earnhardt’s car featured the GM Performance Parts logo on his #3 Winston Cup car.
 
The 1980s saw another big boost of visibility for the brand, with GM bringing an 18-wheeler trailer to many of the big races and car shows around the country, offering parts for sale right on site, as well as onsite company representatives to offer guidance for customers’ projects. The brand also made its way into NHRA Drag Racing by sponsoring Warren Johnson, whose multiple Pro Stock championships put the brand at the forefront to a new demographic of customers. In 1989, the first standalone catalog was offered, making it easier than ever to purchase crate engines and performance parts and have them delivered to customers’ doorsteps.

In the 1990s, the performance parts industry saw extreme growth, which continues today.

At the beginning of 2012, the brand was renamed to Chevrolet Performance and broadened its focus from just parts to vehicles and racing as well.

Vehicles 

Today, Chevrolet Performance has aided in the development of many high-performance vehicles.

ZR1 

The 2019 Corvette ZR1 was released at the 2017 Los Angeles Motor show by Chevrolet Performance officials. The car is powered by a supercharged LT5 V8 engine that produces 755 horsepower and 715 foot pounds of torque with high octane fuel and high density air. The car has a top speed of 217 MPH without the rear wing from the factory, and is the most powerful Corvette ever made. The car has the biggest throttle bodies, coming in at 95mm in diameter.

ZL1 

At the 2011 Chicago Auto Show, Chevrolet Performance unveiled the Camaro ZL1, a high-performance model. The car features an LSA engine SAE-rated at 580 horsepower (432 kW) and 556 lb-ft of torque (754 Nm) – making it the most-powerful production Camaro ever.

1LE 

Chevrolet Performance offers an upgrade package for any Camaro with a manual transmission, built to qualify the car for Touring Class racing in the SCCA series.

COPO Camaro 

The year 2012 also saw the relaunch of the COPO Camaro, based on the fifth-generation Chevrolet Camaro. Designed as an homage to the 1969 car of the same name, the COPO Camaro is a factory-built NHRA Stock Eliminator. Only 69 COPOs were built and purchasing opportunities were offered using a random selection process. The cars had three engine options: a naturally aspirated 427 and two supercharged 327 engines, and they had a 2-speed PowerGlide automatic transmission. At the 2012 SEMA show, Chevrolet Performance announced it would offer another 69 COPOs for the 2013 model year.

SS 

The 2014-2017 SS was a full-size performance sedan based on the Australian VF Commodore. The LS3 6.2L V-8 powers the SS, is SAE certified at 415 horsepower (310 kW) and 415 lb-ft of torque (563 Nm), which helps it sprint from 0 to 60 mph in about five seconds. It is matched with a GM 6L80 transmission that can be shifted manually using TAPshift paddles mounted on the steering wheel.

The rear axle has an aggressive 3.27 ratio that enhances the feeling of acceleration. Additional chassis and suspension features include:

MacPherson strut front and multi-link independent rear suspension geometry
Electronic power steering system, optimized for sport driving
Standard Brembo front brakes, with ventilated, 14-inch (355-mm) two-piece rotors and four-piston calipers
Forged aluminum wheels, wrapped in ultra-high-performance Bridgestone tires: 19 x 8.5-inch wheels with 245/40ZR19 tires in front; 19 x 9-inch wheels with 275/35ZR19 tires at the rear.

Handling is also optimized with a nearly 50/50 weight distribution and a low center of gravity – attributes made possible in part by the aluminum hood and rear deck lid that are 30 percent lighter than traditional steel panels.

Engines 

As the creator of the crate engine concept, Chevrolet Performance has many varieties of crate engines available. It has offerings in the big-block, Small-block, circle track, LSX, LS, and E-ROD categories.

Crate Powertrains 

In addition to individual engines, Chevrolet Performance also offers complete crate powertrains, billed under the Connect & Cruise name. The packages include an engine, a transmission, an engine control module, transmission control, and an installation kit. It comes in LS3 and LSA configurations, which make 430 and 556 horsepower, respectively.

Transmissions 

Chevrolet Performance offers an extensive lineup of transmissions for installation onto GM-based powertrains. Its automatic transmissions come from the Hydra-Matic and SuperMatic lines of transmissions, while the manual transmissions come from the Tremec® line.

Racing 

Chevrolet Performance has a major presence in many of the top racing series, including NHRA, NMCA, SCCA, IMSA, IndyCar, and NASCAR, while also supporting semi-pro racers with a presence at circle track events. It also sponsors events such as the LSX Shootout at the NMCA finals every year.

Chevrolet Performance’s main presence at the races is the Chevrolet Performance rig on site to offer support to customers who have questions about their projects, as well as offer parts for sale.

In 2012 Chevrolet returned to the IndyCar Series, partnering with Ilmor on the Chevrolet Indy V6 engine program and supplying free engines for Team Penske and rest of Chevrolet-powered IndyCar Series teams are customers by pay lease system.

References

External links
 Chevrolet Performance - New Vehicle Upgrades

Official motorsports and performance division of automakers
Companies based in Macomb County, Michigan
General Motors subsidiaries
Warren, Michigan